This is a list of programs formerly broadcast by the Israeli Channel 1.

Formerly broadcast by Channel 1
Prominent Channel 1 TV productions formerly broadcast on Channel 1:

Channel 1 productions 
 Diary (יומן) a weekly current affairs news show, it's transmitted every Friday at night .
 Everything Justiciable (הכל שפיט) 
 Garlic, Pepper and Olive Oil (שום פלפל ושמן זית) 
 IBA News - the channel's daily news broadcast in English
 It is time for language (הגיע זמן לשון) 
 The Jews are Coming (היהודים באים) 
 Like It Was (כך היה) 
 Mabat LaHadashot (מבט לחדשות) - evening news and current affairs, formerly presented by Haim Yavin
 MeHayom LeMahar (מהיום למחר) - a current affairs news show broadcast half an hour before midnight
 Psuko Shel Yom (פסוקו של יום) - a daily midnight program reciting selected daily biblical, Midrash or Aggadah verses
 A second look (מבט שני) 
 View of the World (רואים עולם)

Current events
 Almost midnight (כמעט חצות)
 Focus (מוקד)
 Good Morning Israel (בוקר טוב ישראל)
 The news of the past week (חדשות השבוע)
 Popolitika (פופוליטיקה)
 Press Conference (מסיבת עיתונאים)
 Sports Broadcast (מבט ספורט)

Investigative shows
 Kolbotek (כלבוטק)

Documentaries
 Barricades (מיתרסים)
 Clean the head is necessary (ניקוי הראש הוא הכרחי)
 End of the oranges season (סוף עונת התפוזים)
 The Film that Wasn't (הסרט שלא היה)
 In the Jewish state (במדינת היהודים)
 Pillar of Fire (עמוד האש)
 The representatives (הנבחרים)
 Revival (תקומה)
 To the water wells (אל בורות המים)

Culture shows
 Ad pop (עד פופ)
 Another Hit (עוד להיט)
 A hit to the head (להיט בראש)
 Made in Israel (תוצרת הארץ)
 What a life (חיים שכאלה)

Entertainment shows
 Cleaning the head (ניקוי ראש)
 The coop group (חבורת לול)
 From Menny (ממני)
 Motzash (מוצ"ש)
 Shulchan Aruch with Doron Nesher (שולחן ארוך עם דורון נשר)
 This is my secret (זה הסוד שלי)

Sports programs
 First Goal (שער ראשון)
 Saturday's Game (משחק השבת)
 Sports broadcast (מבט ספורט)

Original series
 Chedva & Shlomick (חדווה ושלומיק)
 Late-night stories (סיפורים לשעת לילה מאוחרת)
 Michel Ezra Safra and his Sons (מישל עזרא ספרא ובניו)

Youth programs
 Animals and smiles (חיות וחיוכים)
 Cabbage head (ראש כרוב)
 Carousel (קרוסלה)
 Foxy Fables (משלים שועליים)
 Hopa Hey (הופה היי)
 Jinji (ג'ינג'י)
 Kindergarten Party (מסיבת גן)
 The last vication (החופש האחרון)
 Legends of King Solomon (אגדות המלך שלמה)
 Sammy and Soosoo (סמי וסוסו)
 Service is not included (לא כולל שירות)
 Shmil the cat (החתול שמיל)
 Suspended in the air (תלויים באוויר)
 Take a chance (קח סיכוי)
 Tamari's hut (הצריף של תמרי)
 Telepele (טלפלא)
 Three Four Five and a half (שלוש ארבע חמש וחצי)
 Tofsim Rosh (תופסים ראש)
 Toses (תוססס)
 Trust me (סמוך עליי)
 The Tsatskanim (הצצקנים)
 Tzipi nonstop (ציפי בלי הפסקה)
 Tzippi Without a Break (ציפי בלי הפסקה)
 Zap La Rishon (זאפ לראשון)
 Zipper (ריץ' רץ')

Sitcoms
 HaMis'ada HaGdola (המסעדה הגדולה)
 Neighbors (שכנים)
 So what? (כן מה?)
 Straight to the point (סטרייט ולעניין)

Hosting shows
 Friday with Gaon (שישי בגאון)
 Friday with Michal (שישי עם מיכל)
 A reason to celebrate (סיבה למסיבה)
 Weekend (סופשבוע)

Imported TV shows 
 CSI: Crime Scene Investigation
 CSI: Miami
 CSI: NY
 Degrassi: The Next Generation
 Downton Abbey
 Fargo
 Law & Order: Special Victims Unit
 The Simpsons

Children's/animated
3-2-1 Contact
Barbapapa
Belle and Sebastian
Biker Mice From Mars
Bosco Adventure
Bouli
The Busy World of Richard Scarry
Calimero
Captain Planet and the Planeteers
The Care Bears
Chip 'n Dale Rescue Rangers
The Chronicles of Narnia
C.O.P.S.
Count Duckula
Danger Mouse
Denver, the Last Dinosaur
Digimon Adventure
Digimon Adventure 02
Disney's Adventures of the Gummi Bears
Ducktales
Fushigi no Kuni no Alice
G.I. Joe: A Real American Hero
Garfield and Friends
The Girl from Tomorrow
Jim Henson's Muppet Babies
Kidd Video
La Linea
Little Women
Looney Tunes
Macron 1
Magical Princess Minky Momo
The Mask: The Animated Series
Maya the Bee
Mr. Hiccup
The New Adventures of Winnie the Pooh
Ovide
Piccolino no Bōken
Postman Pat
The Power Team
Pumuckl
The Raccoons
The Smurfs
Snorks
Spiff and Hercules
Teenage Mutant Ninja Turtles
Teletubbies
Tiny Toon Adventures
Tweenies
Visionaries: Knights of the Magical Light
Woof!
X-Men

Teen drama
Heartbreak High

Comedy
ALF
The Cosby Show
Coupling
Fawlty Towers
Home Improvement
The Muppet Show
Roseanne
Soap
Three's Company
Who's the Boss?
Yes Minister

Mini-series 
All the Rivers Run
I, Claudius
North and South
Roots

Supernatural/sci-fi/action/adventure
The A-Team
Airwolf
Are You Afraid of the Dark?
Charlie's Angels
Columbo
The Flash
Hercules: The Legendary Journeys
MacGyver
Mission: Impossible
The Prisoner
The Six Million Dollar Man
Stargate Atlantis
Stargate SG-1
Starsky and Hutch
Threshold
The Time Tunnel
Xena: Warrior Princess
Zorro

Drama/mystery
The Brothers
Dallas
Dynasty
Homicide: Life on the Street
L.A. Law
Law & Order
Little House on the Prairie
Northern Exposure
Rumpole of the Bailey
Thirtysomething
Twin Peaks
Upstairs, Downstairs
Wiseguy

Lists of television series by network
Israeli television-related lists